Embarcadero Marina Park North is a park in San Diego, in the U.S. state of California.

The park features Donal Hord's 1956 sculpture Morning.

See also
 Embarcadero Marina Park South

References

External links
 

Parks in San Diego